Vai Lung Thlan is a variety of the board game mancala variant played by the Mizo people of eastern India. The game is played on a board with 12 holes in two rows. Initially each hole contains five beads.

References

Further reading 
 Russ L. The Complete Mancala Games Book: How to play the World’s oldest Board Games. Marlowe & Company, New York 2000.

Traditional mancala games
Indian board games